RSIPV Lata is one of the Pacific Forum patrol boats Australia gave to the Royal Solomon Islands Police Force.

Background

Australia also helped build bases for the vessels, provide training, and help with maintenance.

Design

Australia designed the vessels to use commercial off-the-shelf equipment instead of cutting-edge, high-performance, military grade equipment, to ease the maintenance burden for their smaller neighbours.

Operational history

According to the Nautilus Institute rebels commandeered Lata in June 2000, and used it to bombard Honiara, capital of the Solomon Islands.

Australian Foreign Minister Bob Carr inspected Lata, and her sister ship , on a visit to Honiara in August 2012.

In February and March 2017 Lata engaged in a joint fishery protection operation with her sister ship from Vanuatu, .

In April 2018 Marise Payne, Australian Minister of Defence, inspected Lata, during a visit to Honiara.

Replacement

Australia replaced Lata with the RSIPV Gizo a larger and more capable , on November 8, 2019. Her sister ship, Auki is scheduled to be replaced in 2022 or 2023.

Lata was officially decommissioned at Aola Base, Point Cruz in Honiara, on September 11, 2019.  She then proceeded to Australia for recycling.

References

External links
 

Lata
Lata
1988 ships